The Fussball Club Basel 1893 1979–80 season was their 86th season since the club was founded. It was their 34th consecutive season in the top flight of Swiss football after they won promotion during the season 1945–46. They played their home games in the St. Jakob Stadium. René Theler was the club's chairman for the fourth consecutive season.

Overview

Pre-season
Helmut Benthaus was first team manager for the fifteenth consecutive season. There were a number of players that left the squad during the off-season. Midfield player Urs Siegenthaler moved on to Schaffhausen after eight years and 112 league games with the club. Stricker Roland Schönenberger moved on to Young Boys after four seasons, he had played 110 league games and scored 41 league goals. Defender Paul Fischli ended his professional career. After ten years with the club he moved on to local amateur team FC Münchenstein as player-coach. Between the years 1968 and 1979 Fischli played a total of 395 games for Basel scoring a total of 22 goals. 189 of these games were in the Nationalliga A, 52 in the Swiss Cup and Swiss League Cup, 59 in the European competitions (European Cup, Cup Winners' Cup, UEFA cup and Cup of the Alps) and 95 were friendly games. He scored seven goals in the domestic league, two in the cup competitions, two in the European competitions and the other 11 were scored during the test games.

In the other direction the experienced René Hasler and youngster Ernst Schleiffer both signed in from Xamax. Joseph Küttel signed in from Young Boys. Two local players joined both from the other side of the border. French player Serge Gaisser joined in from St. Louis and German Manfred Jungk joined from SV Weil.

Basel played a total of 57 games in their 1979–80 season. 36 matches were played in the domestic league, two in the Swiss Cup, one in the Swiss League Cup and 18 were friendly matches. The team scored a total of 160 goals and conceded 62. All of their friendly games were played away from home. Of their 18 test games, 14 were won, two were drawn and two ended with a defeat. One of the defeats was against the Swiss national team.

Domestic league
14 teams played in the 1979–80 Nationalliga A. The qualification round was played as double round-robin. The top six teams were qualified for the championship group. There was no relegation round to be held this season and the bottom two teams were to be relegated after the qualification. Following the poor season the year before Basel started the season as outsiders. Reigning Champions Servette together with the two clubs Grasshopper Club Zürich and FC Zürich were favorites. Benthaus declared qualification to the UEFA Cup as the team's primary aim. Basel ended the qualification round in second position, two points behind Servette and one ahead of the Grasshoppers. In the championship group the points obtained in the qualification were halved as a bonus (rounded up). Basel won the Championship with 33 points, two ahead of both second place Grasshopper Club and third placed Servette. Basel scored a total of 91 goals conceding 38 in the 32 league games. This was the club's eighth championship title in their history and the seventh and last under trainer Benthaus.

Erni Maissen and Detlev Lauscher led the team's top goal scorers list after the qualifying phase, both with 13 league goals. At the end of the season they were joined by Joseph Küttel and all three managed to score 18 league goals during the season. Maissen had played in 35 league matches, Lauscher had played in 33 and Küttel had had 32 appearances. Goalkeeper Hans Küng and the two defenders Jean-Pierre Maradan and Jörg Stohler played in all 36 domestic league games. In the qualification round 22, the home match at the Landhof on 26 April Küttel scored four goals as Basel won 6–1 against Xamax. In the home match against Luzern on 17 May Lauscher went one better and scored five goals as Basel won 8–2.

Swiss Cup and League Cup
All NLA teams entered the Swiss Cup in the round of 32. Basel were drawn away against Mendrisiostar where they won 3–1. In the second round, again away from home in the Wankdorf Stadium and this against Young Boys. In the Swiss League Cup Basel were also drawn away from home against the Young Boys. Basel lost both duels and thus without further cup matches to contest they had enough strength and energy to win the Swiss championship.

Players 

 

 
 

 
 

 

 

 
 
 
 

Players who left the squad

Results 
Legend

Friendly matches

Pre- and mid-season

Winter break

Nationalliga A

Qualifying phase matches

Qualifying phase table

Championship group

Championship table

Swiss Cup

Swiss League Cup

See also 
 History of FC Basel
 List of FC Basel players
 List of FC Basel seasons

References

Sources 
 Rotblau: Jahrbuch Saison 2015/2016. Publisher: FC Basel Marketing AG. 
 Die ersten 125 Jahre. Publisher: Josef Zindel im Friedrich Reinhardt Verlag, Basel. 
 The FCB squad 1979–80 at fcb-archiv.ch
 Switzerland 1979–80 at RSSSF
 Swiss League Cup at RSSSF

External links 
 FC Basel official site

FC Basel seasons
Basel
1979-80